USS Coronado may refer to:

, a patrol frigate, served in World War II as a convoy escort.
, an auxiliary command ship, hosted the Navy's Sea Based Battle Lab (SBB).
, the fourth littoral combat ship commissioned on 5 April 2014.

United States Navy ship names